East Down was a constituency of the Parliament of Northern Ireland.

Boundaries
East Down was a county constituency comprising the towns of Ardglass, Ballynahinch, Crossgar, Downpatrick, Dunmore, Killinchy, Killyleagh, Kilmore, Saintfield and Strangford, all in the current Down District Council. It was created in 1929 as one of the eight seats replacing the former Down constituency when the House of Commons (Method of Voting and Redistribution of Seats) Act (Northern Ireland) 1929 introduced first past the post elections throughout Northern Ireland. The constituency survived unchanged, returning one member of Parliament until the Parliament of Northern Ireland was temporarily suspended in 1972, and then formally abolished in 1973.

Politics
East Down had a unionist majority, and consistently elected Ulster Unionist Party members. On occasions, however, it was contested by members of the Ulster Liberal Party, and various nationalist candidates who usually received over 40% of the votes cast.

Members of Parliament

Elections

At the 1933 Northern Ireland general election, Alexander Gordon was elected unopposed.

 

At the 1945 Northern Ireland general election, Alexander Gordon was elected unopposed.

At the elections of 1953, 1958 and 1962 Northern Ireland general elections, Brian Faulkner was elected unopposed.

 Parliament prorogued 30 March 1972 and abolished 18 July 1973

References

Constituencies of the Northern Ireland Parliament
Downpatrick
Northern Ireland Parliament constituencies established in 1929
Historic constituencies in County Down
Northern Ireland Parliament constituencies disestablished in 1973